Jan Mydlář (1572–1664) was a 17th-century executioner from Bohemia. He is most known for the red hood-like mask he donned when performing his executions.

Old Town Square execution 
Mydlář carried out the killings in the Old Town Square execution of 27 Bohemian Revolt leaders. These leaders were men of high importance, representing various ranks in Czech society and professions. They had organized an uprising against the Habsburg Emperor Matthias and later Ferdinand II.

On 21 June 1621, Mydlář executed the 27 revolters on behalf of the Austrian House of Habsburg. He beheaded twelve of the men and hanged the other fifteen. The Habsburgs displayed the cut-off heads of the beheaded men on the Prague Old Town Bridge Tower.

Legacy 
Mydlář is the central character of a 19th-century novel by Josef Svátek based on his life, The Memoirs of a Prague Executioner. According to the novel, young Mydlář became an executioner because of a disappointment in love, just before graduating from medical school.

References

External links
 The Memoirs of a Prague Executioner

1572 births
1664 deaths
17th-century Bohemian people
Czech executioners
People from Prague